Dom Prokop Diviš, O.Praem. (26 March 1698 – 21 December 1765) was a Czech canon regular, theologian and natural scientist. In an attempt to prevent thunderstorms from occurring, he inadvertently constructed one of the first grounded lightning rods.

Early life
He was born Václav Divíšek on 26 March 1698 in Helvíkovice, Bohemia (now Ústí nad Orlicí District, Czech Republic). As a child, he began his studies at the Jesuit gymnasium in the town. In 1716, at the age of 18, he entered a gymnasium run at the Premonstratensian abbey located in the village of Louka, where he completed his basic studies in 1719.

Divíšek then entered the novitiate of the abbey, taking the name Prokop (or Procopius). He completed this period of probation the following year and professed his religious vows in the Order. He then proceeded to study philosophy and theology in preparation for ordination to the Catholic priesthood, which occurred in 1726. From 1729 to 1735 he taught philosophy at the abbey gymnasium. During this period, he was sent by his abbot to the Paris Lodron University in Salzburg (now the University of Salzburg) to pursue advanced studies in theology. In 1733 he completed his doctoral dissertation, and was granted the degree of Doctor of Theology.

Diviš then returned to his abbey and resumed the monastic life of a canon regular, serving as sub-prior of the abbey. In 1736 he was appointed as pastor of a parish in Přímětice (now part of Znojmo) which was served by the abbey. He served in that capacity for five years, before being recalled to the abbey in April 1741, where he served as its prior. During the spring of the following year, in the course of the First Silesian War, the abbot, Antonin Nolbek, was arrested by the forces of the Kingdom of Prussia and taken to a prison in Prussia. The payment of a large ransom by Diviš for the abbot's release incurred his displeasure, leading him to return Diviš to the parish in Přímětice.

Scientist
Back at the parish, Diviš became responsible for the management of farmland belonging to it. He undertook the construction of water conduits on the property. As a result, he became interested in a popular new interest in the scientific community of his day, electricity. He began a series of experiments over the next years, mostly on plant growth and therapy with small electrical voltage. He published the results and allegedly demonstrated at the Imperial Court in Vienna. Diviš also constructed the Denis d'or, which allegedly imitated the sounds of various musical instruments. This instrument is dated to 1753, though only one prototype was built, and it vanished soon after Diviš death. The novelty instrument produced electrical shocks as practical jokes on the player. It is disputed whether the Denis d'or sounds were also produced by electricity or if it was an otherwise acoustical instrument.

The news of the death of Georg Wilhelm Richmann, a professor in St. Petersburg, who was killed by lightning in 1753 during his attempt at measuring the intensity of the electric field in the atmosphere, caused Diviš to become interested in atmospheric electricity. In letters, he proposed to several physicists (among them the Academies of Science in St. Petersburg and Vienna, as well as Leonhard Euler) to construct a "weather-machine" – a device that would suppress and prevent thunderstorms and lightning by constantly sucking atmospheric electricity out of the air. His theories were already in his time recognized as fringe science, and thus ignored. When Diviš did not receive answers, he took it up on himself to build such a machine in his own parish.

On 15 June 1754, he erected a forty metres high, free-standing pole in Přímětice, on which he mounted his "weather-machine", consisting of several tin boxes and more than 400 metal spikes. A well-established theory in that time was that more pointed spikes would conduct electricity better. The pole was secured by heavy metal chains that inadvertently also grounded his construction, making it actually one of the first grounded lightning rods. He described his invention as being very effective at driving off storms: clouds formed when the pole was taken down and disappeared when erected again. He took these occasional observations as proof of his theory that the pointed spikes extracted latent electricity out of the atmosphere, deposing them safely before lightning could form. Several local newspapers and novelty papers from Southern Germany made reports on his attempts.

His findings were not well received in the scientific community that largely decided to ignore him. In 1759, a drought threatened Přímětice's farmers, who now took action against their priests' attempts to control the weather and consequently destroyed the first "weather-machine". This led to a dissent between Diviš and his "unruly flock", that only ended when the church superiors advised Diviš to stop his experiments. He was advised to unmount his second "weather-machine" which he had then for security reasons mounted on the tower of his church, and hand it over to the Louka abbey.

Diviš continued to correspond with scientists and promote his own theory which he called Magia naturalis. Fricker and Oetinger, two like-minded priests from Württemberg who had visited him during the experiments, helped him publish it abroad under the German name "Längst verlangte Theorie von der meteorologischen Electricité" (Much desired theory of the metereological electricity), in the same year that Diviš died. Again, the theory was largely ignored, though Tetens reviewed them a few years after and called it a work of fantasy.

Death and legacy
Diviš died on 21 December 1765 in Přímětice.

After years of obscurity, memory of Diviš was reignited in the late 19th century. Now seen as a visionary inventor, supporters saw him as the European inventor of the lightning rod, who invented the lightning rod in the same years as Benjamin Franklin, probably even independently. Despite scientific reviews of Diviš's errors (among others, German physicist Meidinger, who compared evidence about early lightning rods in 1888; and Czech scientific historians Smolka and Haubelt in 2004/05), there are still claims that Prokop Diviš invented the lightning rod. Indeed, his free-standing apparatus in 1754 was better grounded than Franklin's experimental lightning rods at that time.

See also
List of Roman Catholic scientist-clerics

Notes

References 
 Reinhard Breymayer Bibliographie zu Prokop Diviš. In: Friedrich Christoph Oetinger: Die Lehrtafel der Prinzessin Antonia. Hrsg. von Reinhard Breymayer und Friedrich Häußermann; Teil 2. Anmerkungen. Berlin, New York: Walter de Gruyter & Co. 1977, pp. 431–453
 Luboš Nový (Ed.): Dějiny exaktních věd v českých zemích do konce 19. století. Prague 1961
 Wolfgang Grassl: Culture of Place: An Intellectual Profile of the Premonstratensian Order. Nordhausen: Bautz 2012.

External links

 "Procopius Divisch" in Catholic Encyclopedia (Divis died December 25, not December 21 as claimed there)
 .

1698 births
1765 deaths
People from Ústí nad Orlicí District
Czech scientists
Czech inventors
Premonstratensians
18th-century Bohemian Roman Catholic priests
Catholic clergy scientists
University of Salzburg alumni